Třebotov is a municipality and village in Prague-West District in the Central Bohemian Region of the Czech Republic. It has about 1,500 inhabitants.

Administrative parts
Villages of Kala and Solopisky are administrative parts of Třebotov.

Notable people
Hana Růžičková (1941–1981), gymnast, Olympic medalist

References

Villages in Prague-West District